Robert Samatan, nicknamed Bob la Science (Toulouse, 16 April 1909 - Antibes, 4 May 1986) was a French rugby union and rugby league footballer.

He debuted for T.O.E.C (rugby union), 1.78m tall and weighing 76 kg at his debut, later he played at left wing for SU Agen (but also as right wing or number eight).

A very powerful player, he is the forerunner of the modern wingers' playing style. The first player to be inspired by his lively and alert technique was Jean Dauger, who played for Bayonne.

In March 1934, he was dismissed from SU Agen, and was part of the rugby league team of the "Galia's Boys" who made a memorable tour in England under the management and captainship of its creator Jean Galia. His status as a Pioneer (Galia's Boy) did not qualify him as a French International.

Opting for rugby league, he integrated the Roanne XIII squad where Max Rousié and Jean Dauger played alongside him in 1938.

In 1951, he led the first French tour of a team sport (e.g. France national rugby league team) in Australia and New Zealand.

In his civil life, he worked as wholesaler in the alimentar sector.

Biography 
In March 1934, Robert Samatan made an interview for L'Auto after switching to rugby league where he denounced the hypocrisy and the 'shamateurism' within the French Rugby Federation since several years. Playing then at the Toulouse Lyceum, he received an offer from Annibert (of Stade Toulousain, who later became a member of the French Athletics Federation where he dictated the laws of the full amateurism). Annibert promised him a success at his exams and numerous advantages and Mr. Furst of Stade Toulousain also proposed him 200 francs per month, which convinced Samatan to sign. After some months, his salary quadrupled and numerous clubs offered him a better salary like Quillan and Carcassonne, but it is finally Agen through Mr. Armand Bastoul's intermediary which obtained his signature for 25.000 francs and a situation, which later convinced Maurice Porra  to join him at Agen for 1.500 francs per month. He decided to take part of the creation of a French rugby league team with Jean Galia. Appointed by the latter to convince some players to switch to rugby league, he faced overbids from rugby union clubs which were yet amateur in principle, such as USA Perpignan.

Rugby union career 

 Champion of France (as winger) with SU Agen (1930)
 International (10 caps) for France A (1930 -1931)

Rugby league career 

 Team honours :
 Winner of the French Championship : 1939 (Roanne).
 Winner of the Lord Derby Cup : 1935 (Lyon-Villeurbanne) et 1938 (Roanne).
 Individual honours :
 International in four occasions for France between 1934 and 1936.
 Co-trainer of France (being the first French team of a team sport (France national rugby league team) who made in 1951 a tour (successful and of 2,5 months) in Oceania) (1951-1955).

International Caps

Notes and references

Notes

References

External links
Robert Samatan international statistics at ESPN Scrum
Bob Samatan at rugbyleagueproject.com

1909 births
1986 deaths
Dual-code rugby internationals
France international rugby union players
France national rugby league team coaches
France national rugby league team players
Lyon Villeurbanne XIII players
RC Roanne XIII players
Rugby league coaches
Rugby league wingers
Rugby union wings
Rugby union players from Toulouse
SU Agen Lot-et-Garonne players